John 18 is the eighteenth chapter of the Gospel of John in the New Testament of the Christian Bible. This chapter records the events on the day of the Crucifixion of Jesus, starting with the arrest of Jesus the evening before (in Judaic calculation, this would be considered part of the same day). The three denials of Peter are interwoven into the narrative concerning the trials of Jesus.

The book containing this chapter is unattributed, however early Christian tradition generally considers that John the Evangelist composed the Gospel of John.

Text 
The original text was written in Koine Greek. This chapter is divided into 40 verses.

Textual witnesses
Some early manuscripts containing the text of this chapter are:
Rylands Library Papyrus P52 (~Anno Domini 125; extant verses 31–33, 37–38)
Papyrus 90 (A.D. 150–175; extant verses 36–40)
Papyrus 108 (2nd/3rd century; extant verses 1–5)
Papyrus 66 (A.D. ~200; complete)
Codex Vaticanus (A.D. 325–350)
Codex Sinaiticus (A.D. 330–360)
Codex Bezae (A.D. ~400)
Codex Alexandrinus (A.D. 400–440)
Codex Ephraemi Rescriptus (A.D. ~450; extant verses 1–35)
Papyrus 60 (A.D. ~700; complete).
Papyrus 59 (7th century; extant verses 1–2, 16–17, 22).

Places 
The events recorded in this chapter took place in Jerusalem.

Jesus' betrayal and arrest in Gethsemane (18:1-11)
The opening of chapter 18 is directly connected with the final words of chapter 14:
Arise, let us go from here.
The intervening chapters record Jesus' Farewell Discourse. Alfred Plummer, in the Cambridge Bible for Schools and Colleges (1902), suggests that Jesus and His disciples have "rise[n] from table and prepare[d] to depart at John 14:31, but that the contents of chapters 15-17 are spoken before they leave the room".

Verse 1
When Jesus had spoken these words, He went out with His disciples over the Brook (or winter stream) Kidron, where there was a garden, which He and His disciples entered.

Some translations instead open with "When He had finished praying" or similar words.

 and  refer to "a place called Gethsemane", but it is unnamed here, simply referred to as a garden. In  the place is the mount of Olives.

Verse 2
 And Judas, who betrayed Him, also knew the place; for Jesus often met there with His disciples.

Judas is now called "Judas the betrayer" or "Judas, who is betraying" (ioudas ho paradidous) (John 18:2 and again in verse 5). He comes to this familiar place with troops, a captain and officers and servants of the chief priests and the Pharisees, carrying torches and lanterns and weapons (verse 6, cf. verse 12). H. W. Watkins surmises that Gethsemane might have been belonged to "a friend or disciple" of Jesus. Where many modern translations say that Jesus "met" there with his disciples, or "gathered" there in the Revised Geneva Translation, older versions such as the King James states that they "resorted" there.

This was the garrison band from Fort Antonia, at the north-east corner of the Temple. Peter also came with a weapon (verses 10–11):

Then Simon Peter, having a sword, drew it and struck the high priest’s servant, and cut off his right ear. The servant’s name was Malchus.

Verse 4
Jesus therefore, knowing all things that would come upon Him, went forward and said to them, “Whom are you seeking?”
Plummer notes from this verse that the evangelist's narrative confirms:
the voluntariness of Christ's sufferings, and
the fulfilment of a divine plan in Christ's sufferings
and that the aim of the narrative is to endorse Jesus' earlier words,
I lay down My life that I may take it again. No one takes it from Me, but I lay it down of Myself. I have power to lay it down, and I have power to take it again.
and the evangelist's earlier commentary
Jesus knew that His hour had come that He should depart from this world to the Father, having loved His own who were in the world, He loved them to the end.Plummer, A. (1902), Cambridge Bible for Schools and Colleges on John 18, accessed 8 June 2019

Verse 5"Jesus of Nazareth", they answered."I am he", he said.Judas, the traitor, was standing there with them.A more literal translation of the guards' answer is "Jesus the Nazarene", which Plummer calls "a rather more contemptuous expression than 'Jesus of Nazareth'". Jesus' response is Ἐγώ εἰμι (ego eimi, I am): the word 'he' is not expressed in the Greek text. Plummer comments that "Judas, if not the chief priests, must have noticed the significant words". Verses 6 and 8 repeat the words  Ἐγώ εἰμι (in English, "I am he").

Verse 9That the saying might be fulfilled which He spoke, "Of those whom You gave Me I have lost none".According to the New American Bible Revised Edition, the citation may refer to John 6:39, 10:28 or 17:12.
John 6:39: This is the will of the Father who sent Me, that of all He has given Me I should lose nothing, but should raise it up at the last day.John 10:28: And I give them eternal life, and they shall never perish; neither shall anyone snatch them out of My hand.John 17:12: While I was with them in the world, I kept them in Your name. Those whom You gave Me I have kept; and none of them is lost except the son of perdition, that the Scripture might be fulfilled.Henry Alford, Plummer, and Watkins  concur in associating this verse with John 17:12. Arnold uses this fulfillment to argue (as "an unquestionable proof") that John 17 is a historical account of the words of Jesus and not merely "a description of the mind of our Lord at the time".

In the High Priest's Courtyard (18:12-27)
Jesus and "another disciple", or "the other disciple", who was known to the high priest, are taken to the High Priest's Courtyard, where initially Jesus meets with Annas. The other disciple then brings in Peter. Unusually, John Wycliffe's bible translates , tō archierei as "the bishop".

Verse 19The high priest then asked Jesus about His disciples and His doctrine.Annas is here referred to as "the high priest", although Caiaphas was the high priest that year. Heinrich Meyer notes that Jesus ignores the first part of the question and answers only the second part, "and that by putting it aside as something entirely aimless, appealing to the publicity of His life".

 In Pilate's Court (18:28-38)

Verse 28Then they [the Jewish leaders] led Jesus from Caiaphas to the Praetorium, and it was early morning. But they themselves did not go into the Praetorium, lest they should be defiled, but that they might eat the Passover.The Jewish leaders: words supplied by the New International Version to clarify "they". The reference is to the Sanhedrists, according to Scottish Free Church minister William Nicoll. The text here confirms that in John's timeline, the trial of Jesus took place before the Passover and therefore likewise the events of chapters 13-17 preceded the Passover: cf. : before the Feast of the Passover ...Verse 31
 Then Pilate said to them, "You take Him and judge Him according to your law." Therefore the Jews said to him, "It is not lawful for us to put anyone to death,"Verse 37
 Pilate therefore said to Him, "Are You a king then?" Jesus answered, “You say rightly that I am a king. For this cause I was born, and for this cause I have come into the world, that I should bear witness to the truth. Everyone who is of the truth hears My voice.”Cross reference: Matthew 27:11; Mark 15:2; Luke 23:3

What is truth? (18:39-40)
Verse 38

 Pilate said to Him, "What is truth?" And when he had said this, he went out again to the Jews, and said to them, "I find no fault in Him at all".''

See also 
 Arrest of Jesus
 Barabbas
 Denial of Peter
 Jerusalem
 Jesus Christ
 Pontius Pilate
 Rylands Library Papyrus P52
 Sanhedrin trial of Jesus
 Other related Bible parts: Matthew 26, Matthew 27, Mark 14, Mark 15, Luke 22, Luke 23, John 13, John 19

References

External links
 King James Bible - Wikisource
English Translation with Parallel Latin Vulgate
Online Bible at GospelHall.org (ESV, KJV, Darby, American Standard Version, Bible in Basic English)
Multiple bible versions at Bible Gateway (NKJV, NIV, NRSV etc.)

 
John 18
Pontius Pilate
Gethsemane